Cristi Harris (born December 3, 1977, in East Point, Georgia, U.S.) is an American actress most notable for her role as Emily Davis in NBC's soap opera Sunset Beach. She also had a short guest role as Tina Simms on NBC's Passions.

Cristi became a film producer with The Unhealer teaming up with her brother J. Shawn Harris.

References

External links
 

American soap opera actresses
1977 births
Living people
21st-century American women